Maninagar railway station is a major railway station in South Zone, Ahmedabad, India. This railway station is in a developed suburban area of Ahmedabad. It is well connected by rail. Sixty-two trains halt here.

Major trains

Following trains halt at Maninagar railway station:

 Howrah–Ahmedabad Superfast Express
 Saurashtra Janata Express
 Ahmedabad–Darbhanga Sabarmati Express
 Sabarmati Express
 Lok Shakti Express
 Sayajinagari Express
 Gujarat Mail
 Saurashtra Express
 Gujarat Superfast Express
 Somnath–Jabalpur Express (via Itarsi)
 Somnath–Jabalpur Express (via Bina)
 Gujarat Queen
 Vadodara–Ahmedabad Intercity Express
 Navjeevan Express
 Karnavati Express
 Yesvantpur–Ahmedabad Weekly Express
 Gandhidham–Nagercoil Express
 Ernakulam–Okha Express
 Thiruvananthapuram–Veraval Express
 Bhuj–Pune Express
 Bhagat Ki Kothi–Pune Express
 Bhavnagar Terminus–Kakinada Port Express
 Rajkot–Coimbatore Express
 Rajkot–Secunderabad Express
 Gorakhpur–Okha Express

References

Railway stations in Ahmedabad
Ahmedabad railway division
Year of establishment missing